Hilal Al-Quds Club  is a Palestinian sports, cultural, social, scouting, artistic and youth club. It is a club that has many sports activities, one of which is football . It is considered one of the oldest clubs in Palestine . It was established in 1972 within the walls of the Old City  in the city of Jerusalem. The club's motto is “Development, training and rehabilitation of Jerusalemite youth is the focus of our cause.” 

Al-Hilal Al-Quds Club is located in the heart of Jerusalem, meters away from the city walls and near the Palestinian Museum. 12,500-capacity Faisal Al-Husseini International Stadium is their home stadium in Al-Ram, near Jerusalem, this location has its own significance because it is a key location in relation to the city; it is surrounded by the most significant schools, institutes, and colleges in the Holy City; it is far from downtown Jerusalem because the area takes on a residential character; however, it is close in that all of its supporters and members can get there on foot; local sports critics dubbed it the "Castle" because it is situated in the center of the city. as well as its participation in a variety of sports, scouting, social, cultural, and creative endeavors.

History
Hilal Al-Quds was established in 1972 as an idea by Mahdi Hijazi. At the end of 1975, elections for an administrative body were held, and Ayoub Hijazi won as president. The main objectives of the new board of directors were to form a football team from the people of the city that could compete with other teams, especially the top teams at that time, and work to develop the social field in the city of Jerusalem, and prepare to build a scout team that would serve the people of the town, and pay attention to other individual and group games, but it was The most prominent of these activities is the interest in the football sector for all age groups. In the year 1975, there was a team for the Cubs, where their training was supervised by the player Maan Al-Qutb, while Mahdi Hegazy was coaching the youth team. At the end of 1975, the club was accepted into the Palestinian Clubs Association as an active member, in addition to many friendly meetings, and large crowds were crawling behind the team, present with the team in all West Bank stadiums.

The official launch of Al-Hilal Club at a professional level began in 1978, and there were numerous individual, group, cultural, and social sports activities in it including football, boxing, judo and karate.

Badge

Honours
West Bank Premier League
 Winners (4): 2011–12, 2016–17, 2017–18, 2018–19

 Palestine Cup
 Winners (1): 2017–18

 West Bank Cup
 Winners (3): 2010–11, 2013–14, 2017–18

Performance in AFC competitions
AFC Cup: 4 appearances
2015: Play-off round
2018: Play-off round
2019: Group stage
2020: TBD

AFC President's Cup: 1 appearance
2013: Final stage

Players

References

External links
Club profile at Soccerway

Football clubs in the West Bank
Sport in Jerusalem
Association football clubs established in 1972